Heinrich Wöhlk (9 April 1913 – 23 December 1991 in Schönkirchen) was a German optometrist.

Life 
In 1940, German optometrist Heinrich Wöhlk invented plastic Contact lenses, based on his experiments performed during the 1930s. In 1951, he started his own company.

External links 
 Woehlk.com

References 

German optometrists
20th-century German inventors
German company founders
20th-century German businesspeople
1913 births
1991 deaths